DyAnne DiSalvo (DiSalvo-Ryan) is an American artist and author of children's literature, best known for her string of books that focus on building better communities, including City Green (HarperCollins, 1994) and Uncle Willie and the Soup Kitchen (HarperCollins, 1991). DiSalvo is the illustrator of more than 50 books for children.

Early life and career
DiSalvo was born and raised in Brooklyn, New York. She attended Fontbonne Hall Academy for Girls in Brooklyn, and studied art at the School of Visual Arts in New York City. Before illustrating children's books, DiSalvo worked as an artist for Hallmark Cards.
In 1982, she met then-Senior Editor Jane Feder at Harper and Row, now HarperCollins. Feder opened her own eponymous agency representing children's book illustrators, and DiSalvo was her first client.

DiSalvo has traveled to schools around the world with her artist/author presentation, which is targeted for students K through 8, and focuses on the art of writing rough drafts and what it really takes to be a working artist. In the fall of 2010, DiSalvo presented at the United Nations International School of Hanoi in Vietnam.

Books written and illustrated by DiSalvo

Uncle Willie and the Soup Kitchen (1991) 
Inspired by her experience as a volunteer at Chips Soup Kitchen in Brooklyn, DiSalvo wrote and illustrated Uncle Willie and The Soup Kitchen (1991), which was later awarded the 1991 Children's Book of the Year/The Child Study Association of America Book Committee, and Notable 1991 Children's Book National Council for the Social Studies / Children's Book Council United. The book was featured on the children's television show Reading Rainbow in 1996, and in 2000, it was adapted into a children's play at Puttin' on The Ritz Theatre in Oaklyn, New Jersey.

City Green (1994) 
In 1994, DiSalvo published City Green, a story about a little girl who helps turn a city lot into a city garden. In 2009, the illustrations in City Green were reconstructed in the form of a children's playground and featured at the Dallas Arboretum and Botanical Garden's Storybook Playhouse competition. The book was also turned into a musical and produced in Berkeley, California by Stagebridge Theater Company. In 2019, HarperCollins issued a 25th anniversary edition of City Green, honoring the book as a modern-day classic in children's literature.

List of books written and illustrated by DiSalvo 

 Going to Grandma’s House (1998)
 A Dog Like Jack (2000)
 Grandpa's Corner Store (2001)
 A Castle on Viola Street (2001)
 Spaghetti Park (2002)
 The Sloppy Copy Slipup (2006)

Books illustrated by DiSalvo

By Mary Pope Osbourne 

 Mo to the Rescue (1988)
 Mo and his Friends (Dial, 1989)

By Beverly Cleary 

 Two Dog Biscuits (1986)
 The Real Hole (1986)
 The Growing-Up Feet (1987)
 Janet's Thingamajigs

By Jane O’Connor 

 Kate's Skates (1996)
 Nina, Nina Ballerina (1996)
 Nina, Nina Star Ballerina (1997)
 Nina, Nina Copycat Ballerina (2000)

By other authors 

 That New Baby (1980)
 The Bear Under the Bed (E. P. Dutton, 1980)
 The First Day of School (1981)
 Best Friends (1983)
 The Half Birthday Party (1984)
 Those Terrible Terwilliger Twins (Raintree Heinemann-Raintree, 1984)
 Sam Ellis's Island (1985)
 Saturday Belongs to Sara (Bradbury Press, 1988)
 What did Mommy do Before You? (Albert Whitman &Co, 1988)
 The Mommy Exchange (1988)
 Why is Baby Crying? (Albert Whitman & Co, 1989)
 The Best-Ever Good-Bye Party (1989)
 George Washington’s Mother (1992)
 The Go-Between (1992)
 The Christmas Knight (1993)
 You Want Women to Vote, Lizzie Stanton? (1995)
 Olivia and The Real Live Pet (1995)
 Friends and Amigos Series (1995)
 True Blue (1996)
 The Bravest Cat, a True Story About Scarlet (1997)
 Now We Can Have a Wedding (1998)
 The American Wei (Albert Whitman & Co, 1998)
 If I were President (Albert Whitman & Co, 1999)
 Is It Hannukah Yet? (2000)
 Our Eight Nights of Hannukah (2000)\
 A Doll Named Dora Anne (2002)
 Grandma’s Smile (A Neal Porter Book/Roaring Brook Press/Macmillan, 2010)

Awards and honors

The Sloppy Copy Slipup, (Holiday House), 2006:
A Bank Street Bank Street Library Best Children’s Book of the Year
Minnesota Maud Hart Lovelace Maud Hart Lovelace Book Award Nominee 2010–2011
Garden State Children's Book Award Master List 2008–09
Sunshine State Young Readers Award Master List 2008–09
Young Hoosier Book Award Master List 2008–09
Rhode Island State Book Award Master List 2008–09
Great Stone Face Book Award Master List 2006–07

A Castle on Viola Street, (HarperCollins, 2001):
Notable 2001 Children’s Book National Council for the Social Studies / Children’s Book Council

Grandpa’s Corner Store, (HarperCollins, 2001):
Notable 2000 Children’s Book National Council for the Social Studies / Children’s Book Council
Congressional Commendation recipient from the United States House of Representatives, First District, NJ
2001 Puttin' on the Ritz Children's Theatre Production The Ritz Theatre Co. Oaklyn NJ

A Dog Like Jack, (Holiday House, 2000):
Gold Medal recipient of the Irma S. and James H. Black Award/Bank Street College of Education Bank Street Library
June 1999 Philadelphia Children’s Reading Round Table Book of the Month
Publishers Weekly starred review

City Green, (William Morrow and Company, 1994):
Notable 1995 Children’s Book National Council for the Social Studies / Children’s Book Council
2010 Stagebridge Theatre Production Welcome to Stagebridge!.
2009 Dallas Arboretum and Botanical Garden
1999 Puttin' on the Ritz Children's Theatre Production The Ritz Theatre Co. Oaklyn NJ
1996 Reading Rainbow Selection
February 1996 Philadelphia Children’s Reading Round Table Book of the Month
Scholastic Corporation Spanish Edition
Scott Foresman School Edition
Harcourt (publisher) HBJ School Edition
Macmillan Publishers (United States) McGraw-Hill School Edition
Silver Burdett Ginn School Edition

Uncle Willie and the Soup Kitchen, (William Morrow and Company, 1991):
2000 Puttin' on the Ritz Children's Theatre Production The Ritz Theatre Co. Oaklyn NJ
1996 Reading Rainbow Selection
Notable 1991 Children’s Book National Council for the Social Studies / Children’s Book Council
1991 Children's Books of the Year/The Child Study Book Committee

The American Wei, (Albert Whitman & Co. Albert Whitman & Company: Publishing children's books since 1919., 1998):
1998 National Parenting Publications Awards

Now We Can Have A Wedding, (Holiday House, 1998):
June 1998 Philadelphia Children’s Reading Round Table Book of the Month

You Want Women to Vote, Lizzie Stanton?, (Putnam Publishing Group, 1995):
ALA Selection

Olivia and the Real Live Pet, (Macmillan Publishers (United States) for Young Readers, 1995):
October 1995 Philadelphia Children’s Reading Round Table Book of the Month

The Christmas Knight, (Margaret K. McElderry, 1993):
December 1993 Philadelphia Children’s Reading Round Table Book of the Month

George Washington’s Mother, (Putnam Publishing Group, 1992):
February 1993 Philadelphia Children's Reading Round Table Book of the Month

Personal life
DiSalvo played rhythm guitar and vocal harmonies for the power-pop rock and roll band Smash Palace from 1999 - 2012. Signed by Zip Records in 1999, the band has toured the US and the UK and was listed on the BBC Liverpool's Best Top Ten Live Acts, 2006.

DiSalvo lives in Princeton, New Jersey.  She is the mother of two adult children, the educator and entrepreneur John E. Zangari-Ryan and the screenwriter Marja-Lewis Ryan.

References

External links 
 Artist/Author Official Website DyAnneDiSalvo.com
 Society of Children's Books Writers and Illustrators Search Members

Living people
American women illustrators
American illustrators
Artists from Brooklyn
People from Princeton, New Jersey
School of Visual Arts alumni
Year of birth missing (living people)
21st-century American women